Crested Butte is a prominent mountain summit in the Elk Mountains range of the Rocky Mountains of North America. Ski lifts and runs of the Crested Butte Mountain Resort occupy the north side of the mountain.

Climate 
The Köppen Climate Classification subtype for Crested Butte is "Dfc" which is continental subarctic. This climate type is dominated by the winter season with a long, bitterly cold period of minimal daylight hours, heavy snowfall and low humidity.

Geology
Crested Butte is a laccolith, formed when magma intruded into Mancos Shale approximately 30 million years ago. Subsequently the softer, overlying sedimentary rock has eroded away, exposing the more resistant igneous rock. The bulk of Crested Butte is composed of quartz monzonite porphyry and granodiorite porphyry. The lower slopes consist of Mancos Shale overlain with debris from the granitic slopes above. The Mancos Shale at the base of Crested Butte can be an unstable substrate for building and result in geologic hazards such as landslides and earthflows.

Crested Butte is one of over a dozen laccoliths in the Elk and adjacent West Elk Mountains. The magma intrusions associated with these laccoliths resulted in contact metamorphism of the surrounding sedimentary rock and mineralization. The metamorphism also altered the bituminous coal present in the sedimentary rock into a higher quality coal, including anthracite, which was mined extensively in the Crested Butte area during the late 19th and early 20th centuries.

Gallery

See also

List of Colorado mountain ranges
List of Colorado mountain summits
List of Colorado fourteeners
List of Colorado 4000 meter prominent summits
List of the most prominent summits of Colorado
List of Colorado county high points

References

External links

Mountains of Colorado
Mountains of Gunnison County, Colorado
Gunnison National Forest
North American 3000 m summits
Oligocene magmatism
Laccoliths